Jean Gustave Stanislas Bevers (23 September 1852 in Roermond – 5 January 1909 in The Hague) was a Dutch politician. As a Roman Catholic, he was a member of the House of Representatives from 1888 to 1894 and of the Senate between 1902 and 1908, and briefly served as Minister of Water Management between 1908 and 1909.

See also
List of Dutch politicians

References
 

1852 births
1909 deaths
Aldermen of The Hague
Ministers of Transport and Water Management of the Netherlands
Members of the House of Representatives (Netherlands)
Members of the Senate (Netherlands)
Dutch Roman Catholics
People from Roermond